Oktoc is an unincorporated community in Oktibbeha County, Mississippi. Once known as "The Dairy Capital of the South," Oktoc is now home to several defunct dairy farms including Oak Ayr and Mactoc Farms, the largest two in the community. Oktoc has the oldest community club in the state and has not missed one single meeting since its beginning in 1927.

Oktoc was served by East Oktibbeha High School, which was formed by the consolidation of B.L. Moor High School and  Alexander High School until it was merged with Starkville High School in 2015.  Moor High was the Alma mater of Jerry Rice. Oktoc was also the home of baseball player Fred Bell and his brother James "Cool Papa" Bell, one of the fastest baseball players of all time.

History
The community's name derived from the Choctaw language purported to mean "prairie", perhaps via nearby Oktoc Creek.

Today little remains but a community center and dilapidated country store.

References

Unincorporated communities in Mississippi
Unincorporated communities in Oktibbeha County, Mississippi
Mississippi placenames of Native American origin